Nil Tun Maung (born 30 September 1931) is a Burmese weightlifter. He competed at the 1952 Summer Olympics, the 1956 Summer Olympics and the 1960 Summer Olympics.

References

External links
 

1931 births
Possibly living people
Burmese male weightlifters
Olympic weightlifters of Myanmar
Weightlifters at the 1952 Summer Olympics
Weightlifters at the 1956 Summer Olympics
Weightlifters at the 1960 Summer Olympics
People from Tanintharyi Region
Asian Games medalists in weightlifting
Weightlifters at the 1954 Asian Games
Weightlifters at the 1958 Asian Games
Medalists at the 1954 Asian Games
Asian Games gold medalists for Myanmar
World Weightlifting Championships medalists